Justin Robert Field MLC is an Australian politician. He has been a member of the New South Wales Legislative Council since 24 August 2016, when he filled a casual vacancy caused by the death of Greens MLC John Kaye. Before entering parliament, Field campaigned for the Lock the Gate Alliance and the Nature Conservation Council, and formerly worked as a military intelligence officer. In April 2019, Field left the Greens to sit as an independent in the Legislative Council, citing problems with internal division and "hyper-partisanship" as reasons for quitting the party.

References

Living people
Members of the New South Wales Legislative Council
Australian Greens members of the Parliament of New South Wales
Australian Army officers
Royal Military College, Duntroon graduates
Deakin University alumni
Year of birth missing (living people)
21st-century Australian politicians